Gamasolaelaps is a genus of mites belonging to the family Veigaiidae. Males of this genus can be distinguished from other members of the family by the lack of spurs on the second pair of legs and the fact the sclerotized shields on the underside of the body are never fused together. Females are more difficult to diagnose, a high powered microscope being required.

Species
 Gamasolaelaps aurantiacus (Berlese, 1903)
 Gamasolaelaps bellingeri Evans
 Gamasolaelaps bidentis Tseng, 1994
 Gamasolaelaps bondwaensis Hurlbutt, 1983
 Gamasolaelaps cerviformis Berlese
 Gamasolaelaps cornuum Karg, 1997
 Gamasolaelaps ctenisetiger Ishikawa, 1978
 Gamasolaelaps cuniculicola Wang, Zhou & Ji, 1990
 Gamasolaelaps dorotheae Koyumdjieva, 1986
 Gamasolaelaps excisus (Koch)
 Gamasolaelaps leptocornutus Karg, 1998
 Gamasolaelaps multidentatus Karg
 Gamasolaelaps pamirensis Barilo, 1987
 Gamasolaelaps praetarsalis Karg, 1997
 Gamasolaelaps pygmaeus Bregetova
 Gamasolaelaps tuberculatus Breg.
 Gamasolaelaps whartoni (Farrier)

References
The genera Cyrthydrolaelaps Berlese and Gamasolaelaps Berlese (Acarina-Mesostigmata) G. Owen Evans, Acarologia, I (1959)
 Joel Hallan's Biology Catalog: Veigaiidae

Mesostigmata